La Recolección Architectural Complex is a former church and monastery of the Order of the Recollects (Ordo Fratrum Minorum Recollectorum) and its adjacent park in Antigua, Guatemala. It is in the western part of the old city.

History

In 1685 two missionaries of the friars of the Recollects arrived, and, with more friars arriving in subsequent years, the City Council was asked for permission to build a monastery. In their 1695 report, the City Council opined that not enough friars were there to support this enterprise and that enough monasteries had already been established. Nevertheless, in 1700 a royal decree was issued for the building of the monastery. In 1701 construction of buildings commenced, followed six years later by the laying of the cornerstone for the Church itself. In 1708 the cloisters, library, and infirmary were completed. The church was inaugurated on May 23, 1717.

A few months later Antigua was afflicted by the 1717 earthquakes damaging the church and the cloisters. After repairs, the monastery housed 35 friars in 1740. The complex suffered again in the 1751 earthquakes and more so in the devastating Santa Marta earthquakes of 1773. The church lost its base wall and most of the presbytery and the crossing, while the aisles, choir and its upper side were render useless.

Throughout the years, man-made destruction further demolished the complex, as remnants were used as a stable, as a soap factory, and as a sport complex. Materials were also removed for outside construction.

Today

Today the ruins are surrounded by parkland; they are a protected national monument. Large masses of masonry are found, mainly inside the church. There is public access to the cloisters; there is no access to the catacombs.

In film
The initial earthquake sequences from the Jack Nicholson's film The Border were filmed in Antigua Guatemala, specifically in La Recoleccion.

Gallery

See also 

 1773 Guatemala earthquake
 List of places in Guatemala

Notes and references

References

Bibliography

Further reading

External links

Franciscan monasteries in Guatemala
Roman Catholic churches in Antigua Guatemala